The petrosal branch of middle meningeal artery enters the hiatus for greater petrosal nerve, supplies the facial nerve and anastomoses with the stylomastoid branch of the posterior auricular artery.

See also
 stylomastoid artery

References 

Arteries of the head and neck